Manzoni–Museo della Liberazione (formerly Manzoni) is an underground station on Line A of the Rome Metro, inaugurated in 1980. It is located under the junction of Viale Alessandro Manzoni, Via Emanuele Filiberto and Via San Quintino, in Esquilino rione.

Located nearby 
 Piazza Dante
 Viale Manzoni
 Museum of the Liberation of Rome. Museum housed in the former headquarters of the SS during German occupation of Italy (via Tasso 145).

Refurbishment 
The station underwent extensive refurbishment from January 2006 to October 2007, when escalators and electrical, safety and communication systems were upgraded. During the works, archaeological remains were found, and this prolonged their duration. Upon reopening, the station was given the new name Manzoni–Museo della Liberazione.

References

External links 

Rome Metro Line A stations
Railway stations opened in 1980
1980 establishments in Italy
Rome R. XV Esquilino
Railway stations in Italy opened in the 20th century